Cameron Charles D. Cuffe (born 5 April 1993) is a British actor. He is known for his roles as Gino in the film Florence Foster Jenkins (2016), William Shannon in the ITV series The Halcyon (2017), and Seg-El in the Syfy series Krypton (2018–2019).

Early life
Cuffe was born in Western part of London to an English mother and an American father of Irish and Italian descent. His Irish paternal family are from Waterford and Tramore. He spent some of his teen years in Boston. He returned to Europe and went on to graduate with a Bachelor of Arts in Acting from The Lir Academy at Trinity College Dublin in 2014.

Career
Cuffe began his professional career in London , appearing in the Park Theatre production of The Vertical Hour as Dennis Dutton and the Donmar Warehouse production of City of Angels as Peter Kingsley.

Cuffe appeared in the 2016 biographical film Florence Foster Jenkins and had a recurring role in the 2017 ITV drama series The Halcyon. After filming an episode of the 2017 ABC drama series Time After Time, Cuffe landed the lead role of Superman's grandfather Seg-El in the Syfy series Krypton, which premiered in March 2018.

Acting credits

Video games

Stage

References

External links
 
 Cameron Cuffe at the Artists Partnership

Living people
1993 births
21st-century English male actors
American people of English descent
American people of Irish descent
American people of Italian descent
American people of Scottish descent
Citizens of Ireland through descent
Citizens of the United States through descent
English male film actors
English male stage actors
English male television actors
English people of American descent
English people of Irish descent
English people of Italian descent
English people of Scottish descent
Male actors from Boston
Male actors from London
People from Hammersmith